is a caldera lake located 40 km south of Kagoshima city; Kyūshū island, Japan. It is perhaps best known to tourists as the location of the purported sightings of a monster named Issie, and as the largest lake on Kyūshū island with a surface area of 11 km² and a shoreline length of 15 km.

Deterioration
The development of the areas surrounding Lake Ikeda has caused the quality of the water to decline since 1955. Other causes include an irrigation project, developed for agricultural field and households in the area, which was initiated in 1965, for it the courses of three nearby rivers were diverted into the lake. The irrigation system has been in operation since 1982, resulting in a considerable improvement of the water quality although since the 1950s the transparency of the lake, though still ranked No. 7 in the world, has decreased from 26.8 m to approximately 5m.

Animals

Lake Ikeda is known to harbour large eels, some six feet in length. In 1998, a benthological survey was conducted in the lake, which found that there were no zoobenthos, although two tubificid oligochaetes and a chironomid were found. The lake was already considered oligotrophic until the 1940s, but one theory for the further drop in underwater life is that the existing life in Lake Ikeda has been affected by Global Warming.

Geology

It is within the Ikeda Caldera and surrounded by its rim and associated volcanic domes.

Mythology
Lake Ikeda is important in the local Shinto folklore of the surrounding regions. Local religious tradition originally held the lake as the origin of humankind.

Issie
 is a Japanese lake monster said to lurk in Lake Ikeda. It is described as being saurian in appearance. The naming convention is analogous to "Nessie" (the Loch Ness Monster).

According to mythology, Issie was a white mare who lived together with her foal on the shore of Lake Ikeda. However, when the foal was kidnapped by a samurai and Issie was unable to find it, she jumped into the lake and her despair transformed her into a giant, saurian beast, which since then frequently surfaces, trying to find her lost child. The creature was reportedly photographed in 1978 by a man who went by the name "Mr. Matsubara". Twenty other people reportedly also saw the creature swimming in the lake in 1978; they described it as black and having two humps, each about 5 meters (16 feet) long.

See also
List of lakes in japan
List of volcanoes in Japan

References

External links 
 Ikeda and Yamagawa: National catalogue of the active volcanoes in Japan - Japan Meteorological Agency
 Ikeda - Geological Survey of Japan

Ikeda
Ikeda
Landforms of Kagoshima Prefecture
Ibusuki, Kagoshima